The 2015 Queensland Handball League is a Brisbane based championship for Handball. It is a home and away structure conducted in April to July 2015, with the winning team qualifying for the National Club Championship.

The Northern Panthers firsts team won the competition from the Logan Wizards. Third was the Northern Panthers seconds and defending champions the University of Queensland were fourth. In the women, the Northern Panthers defeated the University of Queensland to claim the title.

The North Brisbane Spring Competition was held in September 2015 and was a mixed male and female teams competition (similar to University Games rules) which was won by the Panthers Green team. The University of Queensland were the only non Northern Panthers team to participate.

The Northern University Games were held at Toowoomba in July 2015, with defending champions Griffith University again taking out the gold medal. Silver medal winners were again the Queensland University of Technology. This year the University of New England took bronze.

The Junior competition was run by Northern Panthers Handball Association and held during the second school term (April–June 2015) for the second season and featured three boys and one girls team, won by North Brisbane.

Standings

Men's Open

Final

Women's Open
1. Northern Panthers
2. University of Queensland

North Brisbane Seniors Spring Competition

Northern University Games - Mixed

Junior

References

External links
 Northern Panthers webpage
 Handball Queensland webpage
 Northern University Games - Unisport webpage

Handball competitions in Australia
2015 in Australian sport
2015 in handball
2015–16 domestic handball leagues